Colum Eastwood (born 30 April 1983) is an Irish nationalist politician serving as Leader of the Social Democratic and Labour Party (SDLP) since 2015. He has served as the Member of Parliament (MP) for Foyle since 2019, served in Northern Ireland Assembly from 2011 to 2019 and served on Derry City Council from 2005 to 2011.

Eastwood was first elected to the Northern Ireland Assembly in 2011 and was re-elected in 2016 and 2017. He was also the SDLP candidate at the 2019 European Parliament election to represent Northern Ireland. In December 2019 he was elected to the British House of Commons as the Member of Parliament (MP) for Foyle.

Early life
Eastwood was born in Derry, where he was educated at St John's Primary School (Creggan) and at St Columb's College. He later attended the University of Liverpool, where he studied Latin American Studies though he did not finish his degree.

Political career
Eastwood joined the SDLP in 1998 at age 14 to campaign for the Good Friday Agreement. He was drawn to the party by John Hume, Seamus Mallon and the other political giants of that time that "fundamentally changed politics across the island."

He was elected to Derry City Council in 2005 aged 22, and elected for a one-year term as Mayor of Derry in June 2010. Aged 27, he was the youngest mayor of the city to date.

Election to the Northern Ireland Assembly 
Following his election to the Northern Ireland Assembly in May 2011, Eastwood was appointed SDLP representative on the committee of the Office of the First Minister and deputy First Minister. He sat on the Northern Ireland Assembly committees on Standards and Privileges, and the Environment and was appointed to the post of Assembly Private Secretary to the Minister of the Environment Alex Attwood in 2010. 

In 2012 he drew criticism from Unionists including Jim Allister after carrying the coffin at the paramilitary funeral of a former Irish National Liberation Army member in Derry. A masked Real Irish Republican Army gunman fired a volley of shots over the coffin, although Eastwood stated he was not present at the time of the gunfire. He defended his attendance at the funeral saying the deceased was a personal friend and added "I wasn't concerned at the time about who was standing beside me, or about what flag or otherwise was draped over the coffin." It later emerged that party colleague Mark H. Durkan also attended the funeral.

On 14 November 2015, Eastwood contested the leadership election held at the SDLP's annual conference. He beat the incumbent, Alasdair McDonnell, by 172 votes to 133. Eastwood was re-elected to the NI Assembly in 2016 and 2017, receiving 5,000 and 7,240 first preference votes, respectively.

2016

2017

Election to the House of Commons 
On 12 December 2019 Eastwood was elected as Member of the Parliament of the United Kingdom for Foyle in a landslide victory against Sinn Féin candidate, then incumbent, Elisha McCallion. He was the first of the new MPs elected at the 2019 general election to make his maiden speech in the Commons.

On 11 November 2020 during a Westminster Hall debate Eastwood called for a full and independent judicial inquiry into the murder of Belfast solicitor Pat Finucane in 1989.

Leader of the Social Democratic and Labour Party (SDLP) 
Following the SDLP's poor election results in the 2014 local elections, the 2014 European Parliament election and the 2015 Westminster election, the then SDLP leader and MP for South Belfast  Alasdair McDonnell resisted calls to stand down, including from the party's deputy leader Dolores Kelly.

At the SDLP's Annual Conference on 14 November 2015, Eastwood contested the leadership election where he defeated the incumbent, Alasdair McDonnell, by 172 votes to 133.

In July 2021 Eastwood used parliamentary privilege to reveal the identity of Bloody Sunday's 'Soldier F' in the House of Commons.

Personal life
He married Rachael Parkes in December 2013, and they live in Derry with their two daughters.

References

External links

1983 births
Living people
Social Democratic and Labour Party MLAs
Social Democratic and Labour Party MPs (UK)
People educated at St Columb's College
Politicians from Derry (city)
Northern Ireland MLAs 2011–2016
Northern Ireland MLAs 2016–2017
Northern Ireland MLAs 2017–2022
Members of the Parliament of the United Kingdom for County Londonderry constituencies (since 1922)
Mayors of Derry
UK MPs 2019–present
Leaders of the Social Democratic and Labour Party